Eddie Smith (born April 11, 1979) is an American Republican politician who represented District 13 in the Tennessee House of Representatives from January 2014 until his defeat in the November 2018 elections, where he lost to Democrat Gloria Johnson by a 10-point margin.

Education 
Smith earned his bachelor of science from Tusculum College in Greenville, TN.

Legislation 
Smith introduced legislation during the 109th General Assembly to increase penalties for school bus drivers who are caught texting and driving. This bill was crafted in the aftermath of a Knox County Schools bus accident that resulted in the death of two young students and a teachers aid.

References

1979 births
Living people
Republican Party members of the Tennessee House of Representatives
21st-century American politicians
Politicians from Knoxville, Tennessee
Tusculum University alumni